The 1999 Japanese motorcycle Grand Prix was the second round of the 1999 Grand Prix motorcycle racing season. It took place on 25 April 1999 at the Twin Ring Motegi.

500 cc classification

250 cc classification

125 cc classification

Championship standings after the race (500cc)

Below are the standings for the top five riders and constructors after round two has concluded. 

Riders' Championship standings

Constructors' Championship standings

 Note: Only the top five positions are included for both sets of standings.

References

Japanese motorcycle Grand Prix
Japanese
Motorcycle Grand Prix